Lepenica is a village in the Republika Srpska, Bosnia and Herzegovina. According to the 1991 census, the village is located in the municipality of Rogatica.

References

Populated places in Rogatica
Villages in Republika Srpska